Francis Casey Alcantara and Hsieh Cheng-peng were the defending champions, but Hsieh did not compete in the Juniors this year.
Alcantara partnered up with Guilherme Clézar, but they lost in the second round 5–7, 6–4, [6–10] against Jason Kubler and Benjamin Mitchell.

Justin Eleveld and Jannick Lupescu won in the final 6–4, 6–4, against Kevin Krawietz and Dominik Schulz.

Seeds

Draw

Finals

Top half

Bottom half

External links
 Main Draw

Boys Doubles
2010